A list of films produced by the Bollywood film industry based in Mumbai in 1974:

Top-grossing films
The top ten grossing films at the Indian Box Office in 
1974:

A-Z

References

External links
 Bollywood films of 1974 at the Internet Movie Database
 Indian Film Songs from the Year 1974 - A look back at 1974 with a special focus on the Hindi film song

1974
Lists of 1974 films by country or language
Films, Bollywood